İstanbul  is a Turkish-language newspaper published in Istanbul, Turkey.

The newspaper was launched by Habib Edip Törehan in İstanbul, Turkey in 1949. Its original name was Yeni İstanbul ("New İstanbul"). With a newspaper heading in blue, it drew attention among other dailies having traditional red-colored heading. In 1964, it was bought by businessman Kemal Uzan. In 1973, it was renamed to İstanbul. Although it was closed in 1981, the newspaper resumed publication in 1986.

References

Newspapers published in Istanbul
Turkish-language newspapers
Newspapers established in 1949
1949 establishments in Turkey
Publications disestablished in 1981
1981 disestablishments in Turkey
Newspapers established in 1986
1986 establishments in Turkey
Fatih
Daily newspapers published in Turkey